Sonakhali is a village, in Daspur II CD Block in Ghatal subdivision of Paschim Medinipur district in the state of West Bengal, India.

Geography

Location

Area overview
Ishwar Chandra Vidyasagar, scholar, social reformer and a key figure of the Bengal Renaissance, was born at Birsingha on 26 September 1820.

Ghatal subdivision, shown in the map alongside, has alluvial soils. Around 85% of the total cultivated area is cropped more than once. It  has a density of population of 1,099 per km2, but being a small subdivision only a little over a fifth of the people in the district reside in this subdivision. 14.33% of the population lives in urban areas and 86.67% lives in the rural areas.

Note: The map alongside presents some of the notable locations in the subdivision. All places marked in the map are linked in the larger full screen map.

Civic administration

CD block HQ
The headquarters of Daspur II CD block are located at Sonakhali.

Demographics
As per 2011 Census of India Sonakhali had a total population of 2,014 of which 1,008 (50%) were males and 1,006 (50%) were females. Population below 6 years was 213. The total number of literates in Sonakhali was 1,544 (76.66% of the population over 6 years).

Transport
Sonakhali stands at the meeting point of Harekrishnapur-Sonakhali Road and Gopiganj-Sultannagar Road.

Healthcare
Sonakhali Rural Hospital, with 30 beds at Sonakhali, is the major government medical facility in the Daspur II CD block.

References
	

Villages in Paschim Medinipur district